Stary Altynzhar is a rural locality (a settlement) in Novinsky Selsoviet of Volodarsky District, Astrakhan Oblast, Russia. The population was 102 as of 2010. There is 1 street.

Geography 
Stary Altynzhar is located 12 km southwest of Volodarsky (the district's administrative centre) by road. Tuluganovka is the nearest rural locality.

References 

Rural localities in Volodarsky District, Astrakhan Oblast